For World War II military fire weapons, see M1 flamethrower and M2 flamethrower. For other fire weapons, see Flamethrower (disambiguation).

Operation Aflame was a .planned combined operations raid by No. 12 Commando, part of the British army, against Berck in October 1942.

The plan was to have been based on a naval demonstration off the coast, and to have a drop of dummy paratroops and the landing of No. 12 Commando to persuade the Germans that a major landing was about to be made, thereby forcing a major German air response.

Aflame was supposed to be part of the larger strategic operation, Operation Overthrow.

Background

Operation Plan

Preparations

Footnotes 

1942 in France
Conflicts in 1942
World War II British Commando raids